Kanji Dol is a dispersed settlement in the hills south of Črni Vrh in the Municipality of Idrija in the traditional Inner Carniola region of Slovenia. The settlement no longer had any permanent residents according to the 2002 census, but it has been repopulated in recent years.

References

External links 

Kanji Dol on Geopedia

Populated places in the Municipality of Idrija